George Wylie Hutchinson (1852–1942) was a painter and leading illustrator in Britain and was from Great Village,  Nova Scotia, Canada.  He illustrated the works of Arthur Conan Doyle, Rudyard Kipling, Hall Caine, Robert Louis Stevenson and Israel Zangwill.  His paintings inspired the poem "Large Bad Picture" and "Poem", both by Elizabeth Bishop, his great grand niece. Hutchinson was a contributor to and subject of the novel The Master (1895) by Israel Zangwill, with whom he was a close friend.

Hutchinson left Nova Scotia at age 14, as a cabin boy. He studied painting in London at the Royal Academy (1880–1885) and later painted portraits and created illustrations and cartoons for numerous publications such as the Illustrated London News.  At the age of 44, he returned to Nova Scotia for a year in 1896 and taught painting.

By the 1910s and 1920s, Hutchinson appears to have been living in retirement in Clacton-on-Sea, Essex.

Works 

 Arthur Conan Doyle. Sherlock Holmes: A Study in Scarlet" (1891) .
 Arthur Conan Doyle. The Stark Munro Letters - Chapter 5. The Idler, Dec. 5, 1894
Arthur Conan Doyle. Juvenilia. The Idler magazine. January 1893 (re-published in My First Book edited by Chatto & Windus in september 1894).
Rudyard Kipling 
  Robert Louis Stevenson.Treasure Island. Chums (paper) serialization  (29 Aug 1894- 2 Jan 1895).
Hall Caine
       Israel Zangwil. The King of Schnorrers: Grotesques and Fantasies
· I. Zangwill. Cheating the Gallows. The Idler [v3 #13, February 1893] ed. Jerome K. Jerome & Robert Barr (Chatto & Windus; London) 
 Zangwill, Israel, 1864-1926: The Bachelors' Club / by I. Zangwill ; with ill. by George Hutchinson. (London : Henry, 1891)
C. J. Cutcliffe Hyne. The Adventures of a Solicitor.  London: James Bowen,. 1898.
Jane G. Austin. Standish of Standish. 1889.
Barry Pain. The Thirteenth Column. The Windsor Magazine [v1 #3, March 1895] ed. D. Williamson (London: Ward, Lock & Bowden, p. 254 · 
Charles J. Mansford.Luck of the Little Garrison. The Windsor Magazine [v1 #5, May 1895] ed. D. Williamson (London: Ward, Lock & Bowden. 
 Clark Russell. Drove Back. The Idler Magazine, Vol. 6, p. 687
Thomas Nelson Page. Ile Ole Virginia. 1887.
 Henry Herman. A Woman, A mystery. A Romance of Three Revolutions. 1894.
 Henry Herman. His Angel: A romance of the far west. 1892.
 Illustrated London News.
 S. Walkey’s serial  "In Quest of Sheba’s Treasure,"  (1895-1896) volumes. 
 Joseph Howe, Normal College, Nova Scotia (1896)
 Gloud Wilson McLelan (1796-1858), Nova Scotia Museum
Ariel or the London Puck magazine
 Hon. Jonathan McCully on a shingle. Studied at Royal Academy School,
 George R. Sims. A Story of Strawberry Court. The Ludgate Monthly [v2 #3, January 1892] ed. Philip May 
Illustration; The Ludgate Monthly May 1892
Illustration; Chums Oct 12 1892
Illustration; Chums Nov 16 1892
Illustration; The Idler Feb 1893
Illustration; Chums Apr 19 1893
Illustration; Chums May 3, 1893
Illustration; Chums May 24, 1893
Illustration; Chums Jun 14 1893
Illustration; The Windsor Magazine Mar 1895
Illustration; The Windsor Magazine May 1895
Illustration; The Windsor Magazine Sep 1895
Illustration; The Windsor Magazine Apr 1896
Illustration: Holmes Meets Watson [from A Study in Scarlet] (reprinted from Ward, Lock & Co. 1889); Mike Shayne Mystery Magazine Mar 1982

Gallery

References

Further reading 

 Caricatures of the Month: George Hutchinson, London: Review of Reviews, 1892.
 Archibald MacMechan. "His prototype is George Hutchinson, a Folly Village boy, whose Father was master of a small vessel and was lost at sea". Acadiensis, Vol. 6. 1906.
 Lilian Falk. George Hutchinson’s illustrating career. Royal Nova Scotia Historical Society Journal in Vol. 9, 2006. 
Lilian Falk.  "George Hutchinson, a Canadian Illustrator of Robert Louis Stevenson’s Treasure Island," Canadian Children’s Literature (now Jeunesse Journal), Vol., 25:4, No. 96, 1999.
 Lillian Falk. The Master: Reclaiming Zangwill's Only KÃ¼nstlerroman. English Literature in Transition, 1880-1920;2001, Vol. 44 Issue 3, p275, June 2001
 List of Illustrations

External links 

  (none found October 2018)

Artists from Nova Scotia
Canadian cartoonists